{{Infobox person
| image                     = Celebs graces the launch of the Tod’s store 05.jpg
| name                      = Atul Kasbekar
| birth_name                = 
| birth_date                = 
| birth_place               = Mumbai, India
| nationality               = Indian
| education                 = 
| alma_mater                = Brooks Institute, Santa Barbara, US.
| occupation                = Photographer, film producer
| years_active              = 1991–present
| known_for                 = Fashion photography, former Honorary Chairman of Photographers' Guild of India, Chairman 
& managing director of Bling! Entertainment Solutions 
| notable_works             = Kingfisher Calendar
| height                    = <ref name=ht>Priyanka Jain, Not just glam and money: Atul Kasbekar, Hindustan Times, 10 May 2011. Retrieved 13 January 2012.</ref>
| website                   =  
| footnotes                 = 
}}

Atul Kasbekar (born 22 April 1965) is an Indian fashion photographer and Bollywood film producer. He is recognised for his Kingfisher Calendar shoots. He was also the honorary chairman of the Photographer's Guild of India.

Education
Atul Kasbekar studied at Campion School, Mumbai, and Jai Hind College (University of Mumbai). Then he joined UDCT (now Institute of Chemical Technology), Mumbai for chemical engineering but dropped out after the first yearAtul Kasbekar on Gautam Rajadhyaksha, Times of India, 29 December 2001. Retrieved 21 January 2012 to become a photographer. He graduated in 1988 from the Brooks Institute in Santa Barbara, US and was the topper of the batch.

He took training for over a year in Los Angeles and worked with photographers like Dennis Gray, Ron Slenzak, James B Wood, Jay Silverman, Jay P Morgan, Bill Werts and David Le Bon.

Career
Photography

Kasbekar returned to India from the US in 1990. In 1991 he started his professional career as a photographer by starting a studio named Negative Space.

Kasbekar is known for shooting the nineteen editions of the Kingfisher Calendar from 2003 to 2021 which featured models clad in swimsuits. Some of these models (such as Katrina Kaif, Deepika Padukone, etc) were launched into successful acting careers.

Bling! Entertainment
Kasbekar is the owner of a celebrity management company named Bling! Entertainment Solutions which started in 2007. It has partnered with leading international and national brands including PepsiCo, Nestle, HUL, ITC, Airtel, Kingfisher, Samsung, P&G, Sony, Swarovski, LG Mobiles, L'Oreal, Marico, Levi Strauss, Hublot, Toshiba, Panasonic, Canon, Johnson & Johnson, Nerolac and the Swatch Group. Many celebrities including Deepika Padukone, Vidya Balan, Farhan Akhtar, Abhay Deol, Abhishek Bachchan are clients of Bling! Entertainment Solutions.

Corporate Image
Kasbekar launched the company Corporate Image, which manages the identity of the top management and spokespersons within an organization. The specialist imaging service conducts research regarding a company's values, individual tastes and sense of style to create a bank of images which could be used in any communication such as brochure or annual reports by the company. Kasbekar has worked with many corporate leaders including Ratan Tata, Vijay Mallya and Anil Ambani.

Awards and recognition
Kasbekar is the first Indian to win the prestigious International Food and Beverage Creative Excellence Awards (FAB Awards) 2005, held at London, for his work on Kingfisher Calendar.

Film producer

References

External links
 Photographer of the Month – Atul Kasbekar  at Exhibit Magazine''

Indian fashion photographers
Living people
Artists from Mumbai
Brooks Institute alumni
1965 births
University of Mumbai alumni
Photographers from Maharashtra